Edward Evelyn may refer to:
 Edward Evelyn (politician)
 Edward Evelyn (footballer)
 Edward Evelyn (cricketer)